Amish Tripathi (born 18 October 1974) is an Indian author and diplomat. He is known best for his Shiva Trilogy and Ram Chandra Series.

Amish's books have sold over 6 million copies in the Indian subcontinent since 2010. He is also Minister (Culture & Education) at the High Commission of India in the UK and Director of the Nehru Centre, London. In addition, he is a host for TV documentaries, most recently for Discovery TV, in Legends of the Ramayan and also The Journey of India with co-host Amitabh Bachchan.

Early life and education 
Amish Tripathi was born in Mumbai and grew up near Rourkela, Odisha. He is an alumnus of Cathedral & John Connon School; St. Xavier's College, Mumbai; and Indian Institute of Management Calcutta.

Career

As an author 
The Immortals of Meluha, Tripathi's first novel and first in the Shiva Trilogy, was published in February 2010. The second book in the series, The Secret of the Nagas, was released in August 2011, and the third and final installment, titled The Oath of the Vayuputras, was released in February 2013.

The Scion of Ikshvaku was released in June 2015. It is the first book in the Ram Chandra series. It follows the story of Ram and is a prequel to the Shiva Trilogy. The Scion of Ikshvaku won the Crossword Book's "Best Popular Award". Sita: Warrior of Mithila, the sequel to The Scion of Ikshvaku, was released in May 2017. It became the highest-selling book of 2017. Raavan: The Enemy of Aryavarta, the third book in The Ram Chandra series, was released in July 2019. The fourth book in The Ram Chandra Series, War of Lanka, was released on 3 October, 2022. Legend of Suheldev: The King Who Saved India, his first historical book and first book in Indic Chronicles, was released in June 2020.

Tripathi released his first non-fiction book, Immortal India, in August 2017. He also released Dharma: Decoding the Epics for a Meaningful Life in December 2020.

In 2019, Tripathi was appointed by the Government of India as Director of The Nehru Centre, London, in a diplomatic role.

Speaking to News4masses in an interview at the Kolkata Literary Meet in March 2022, Tripathi revealed his plans to come up with a book on Mahabharata soon.

As film producer 

In September 2020, he announced that he is turning into a producer with an adaptation of his novel, Legend of Suheldev: The King Who Saved India, under the banner Immortal Studios, with Wakaoo Films and Casa Media.

As a documentary host 
Amish began his career as a documentary host with Warner Bros Discovery programme, Legends of the Ramayan with Amish. This programme, produced by Wide Angle Films, won the Digital Reinvent award for Best Documentary. Amish also hosted an episode on Faith for the Warner Bros Discovery documentary series The Journey of India, with co-host Amitabh Bachchan, where Amish paid homage to India’s diversity of faiths.

Awards and recognition 
 21st Century Icon Awards, London (2021)
 Golden Book Award - Legend of Suheldev (2022)
 Listed among Top-50 Most Powerful People by India Today (2019)
 Honorary Doctorate by Jharkhand Rai University for outstanding contribution to Art & Literature (2019)
 Hello Hall of Fame Awards for Literary Excellence (2019)
 Jashn-e-youngistan Award (2018)
 Ustad Bismillah Khan Award (2018) for contribution to Indian culture
 Kalinga International Literary Award (2018)
 Distinguished Alumnus Award (2017) from IIM - Calcutta
 Raymond Crossword Popular Fiction Award for his book Scion of Ikshvaku in (2016)
 Selected as an Eisenhower Fellow (A prestigious American programme for young global leaders) (2014)

Bibliography

Shiva Trilogy 
 The Immortals of Meluha (2010)
 The Secret of the Nagas (2011)
 The Oath of the Vayuputras (2013)

Ram Chandra Series 
 Ram: Scion of Ikshvaku (2015)
 Sita: Warrior of Mithila (2017)
 Raavan: Enemy of Aryavarta (2019)
 The War of Lanka (2022)

Indic Chronicles 
 Legend of Suheldev: The King Who Saved India (2020)

Non-fiction 
 Immortal India: Young India, Timeless Civilisation (2017)
 Dharma: Decoding the Epics for a Meaningful Life (2020)

See also
 List of Indian writers

References

External links

 Between History and Mythology: Amish Tripathi
 

Indian male novelists
Living people
Writers from Mumbai
Indian Institute of Management Calcutta alumni
Novelists from Karnataka
People from Kanpur
21st-century Indian novelists
Novelists from Uttar Pradesh
21st-century Indian male writers
1974 births